Lalian Tehsil is a tehsil of the Chiniot District and a city in Punjab, Pakistan. It is located on Sargodha road, 22 km from Chiniot. It became a tehsil of Chiniot District on 2 February 2009. Prior to this, it was a known town in the Chiniot Tehsil and now with the addition of 12 more union councils, it has become a Tehsil with a large number of people in towns and villages.

Demography 
The major language of this sub-district is the Punjabi language.

See also

 Lalian
 Chiniot
 Chiniot District
 Bhawana

References

External links
 Map of Lalian

Chiniot District
Populated places in Chiniot District
Tehsils of Punjab, Pakistan